John of Poitiers-Lusignan (died 7 August 1343) was constable and later regent of the Armenian Kingdom of Cilicia. 

He was son of Amalric, Prince of Tyre, and Isabella of Armenia. His siblings were Guy (Constantine II, King of Armenia) and Agnes, wife of Leo III, King of Armenia.

Marriage and issue
He married (before 1330) Soldane Bagrationi (d. after 1343), daughter of king George V of Georgia. The couple had a son:
 Leo V 1342 - 1393, king of Lesser Armenia (1374-1375), married Marguerite de Soissons. When Mamluks took the kingdom, Leo V became titular king (1375-1393) and he was succeeded by his 2nd cousin king James I of Cyprus.

Death
John was murdered in Cilicia on 7 August 1343.

House of Poitiers-Lusignan
Christians of the Crusades
People of the Armenian Kingdom of Cilicia
1343 deaths
Year of birth unknown